Overeating occurs when an individual consumes more calories in relation to the energy that is expended via physical activity or expelled via excretion, leading to weight gain and often obesity. Overeating is the defining characteristic of binge eating disorder.

This term may also be used to refer to specific episodes of over-consumption. For example, many people overeat during festivals or while on holiday.

Overeating can be a symptom of binge eating disorder or bulimia nervosa.

Compulsive overeaters depend on food to comfort themselves when they are stressed, suffering bouts of depression, and have feelings of helplessness.

In a broader sense, hyperalimentation includes excessive food administration through other means than eating, e.g. through parenteral nutrition.

Treatment
Cognitive behavioural therapy, individual therapy, and group therapy are often beneficial in helping people keep track of their eating habits and changing the way they cope with difficult situations. Often overeating and the related binge eating are related to dieting, body image issues, as well as social pressures.

There are several 12-step programs that helps overeaters, such as Overeaters Anonymous or Food Addicts in Recovery Anonymous and others. 
It is quite clear through research, and various studies that overeating causes addictive behaviors.

In some instances, overeating has been linked to the use of medications known as dopamine agonists, such as pramipexole.

See also

Compulsive overeating
Counterregulatory eating
Behavioral addiction
Binge eating
Binge eating disorder
Food drunk
Gluttony
Inflammation#Systemic inflammation and overeating
Mindless Eating: Why We Eat More Than We Think (book)
Polyphagia
Fasting

References 
 Kessler, David A. The End of Overeating: Taking Control of the Insatiable American Appetite (2009)

External links

Eating behaviors
Habits
Hyperalimentation